The Auob River is a tributary of the Nossob River in the Northern Cape province of South Africa.

Headwaters 
  in Namibia

Mouth 
 , Nossob River

Route 
The river flows about  southeastward through Namibia and Northern Cape.

Rivers of Namibia
Rivers of the Northern Cape